Elegance Garden is a Home Ownership Scheme and Private Sector Participation Scheme court in Tai Po, New Territories, Hong Kong near Uptown Plaza, Wan Tau Tong Estate and MTR Tai Po Market station. It was jointly developed by the Hong Kong Housing Authority and Chevalier Group and has a total of four residential blocks built in 1990.

Houses

Demographics
According to the 2016 by-census, Elegance Garden had a population of 3,175. The median age was 45.6 and the majority of residents (92 per cent) were of Chinese ethnicity. The average household size was 3.2 people. The median monthly household income of all households (i.e. including both economically active and inactive households) was HK$36,060.

Politics
Elegance Garden is located in San Fu constituency of the Tai Po District Council. It was formerly represented by Max Wu Yiu-cheong, who was elected in the 2019 elections until May 2021.

See also

Public housing estates in Tai Po

References

Tai Po
Tai Po District
Home Ownership Scheme
Private Sector Participation Scheme